Ilmandu is a village in Harku Parish, Harju County in northern Estonia. It has a population of 447 (as of 1 December 2019). It is a small village, about 10 kilometers from the city of Tallinn, and 2 kilometers far from Tabasalu, with very good communications and transport links.

References

Villages in Harju County